Rosalie Verner (16 December 1880 Avanduse Parish (now Väike-Maarja Parish), Kreis Wierland – ?) was an Estonian politician. She was a member of III Riigikogu. On 21 May 1926, she resigned his position and she was replaced by August Luik.

References

1880 births
Year of death missing
People from Väike-Maarja Parish
People from Kreis Wierland
Estonian Workers' Party politicians
Members of the Riigikogu, 1926–1929